Himantolophus stewarti is a species of footballfish, a type of anglerfish. The species has mainly been found in the Tasman Sea, though it is likely to be endemic to the same areas as Himantolophus appelii.

References

Himantolophidae
Deep sea fish
Fish described in 2011
Taxa named by Theodore Wells Pietsch III